Königlich Bayerisches Amtsgericht (Royal Bavarian District Court) is a German comedy television series.  It was produced by ZDF in the years 1968 to 1972 and contains 52 episodes.

It is set in the German Empire shortly before World War I and revolves around the court proceedings of the Königlich Bayerisches Amtsgericht in the fictional Bavarian small town Geisbach.  Almost all actors speak with a Bavarian dialect.

The series features many famous Bavarian actors like Gustl Bayrhammer, Hans Baur and Max Grießer.

External links
 

1960s German television series
1968 German television series debuts
1972 German television series endings
Television shows set in Bavaria
Television series set in the 1910s
ZDF original programming
German-language television shows
German legal television series